Arman is the monthly publication of the association of Hazaras in Victoria which serves the growing Afghan community of Melbourne and is distributed Australia-wide. It is published on the first Monday of each month and has a readership base of several thousand. The magazine has three editions, in Dari, in Pashtu and English. Being the only regularly published and widely distributed Dari magazine in Australia, Arman is a valuable source of news, information, feature articles as well as a guide to find products and services for Afghan community.

The first edition of Arman was published in October 2002 in just eight pages and it has developed greatly in terms of both quality and quantity since. It is now a colour magazine in 40 pages and has found its place in Australian Afghan community.

Currently Hamed Saberi is Arman monthly's chief editor and Sharif Samar is the executive officer. It is designed by Arif Fayazi.

References

2002 establishments in Australia
Monthly magazines published in Australia
Hazara diaspora
Hazaragi-language magazines
Local interest magazines
Magazines established in 2002
Magazines published in Melbourne
Multilingual magazines